The 1961 Norwegian Football Cup was the 56th season of the Norwegian annual knockout football tournament. The tournament was open for all members of NFF, except those from Northern Norway. Rosenborg was the defending champions, but was eliminated by the second tier team Brann in the quarterfinal.

The final was played at Ullevaal Stadion in Oslo on 22 October 1961, and was contested by the seven-times former winners Fredrikstad and the second-tier team Haugar who made their debut in the Norwegian Cup final. Fredrikstad won their eighth Norwegian Cup title with an impressive 7-0 win against Haugar in the final, and also secured the double for the third time.

Third round

|colspan="3" style="background-color:#97DEFF"|6 August 1961

|-
|colspan="3" style="background-color:#97DEFF"|Replay: 9 August 1961

|}

Fourth round

|colspan="3" style="background-color:#97DEFF"|27 August 1961

|-
|colspan="3" style="background-color:#97DEFF"|Replay: 30 August 1961

|}

Quarter-finals

|colspan="3" style="background-color:#97DEFF"|10 September 1961

|}

Semi-finals

|colspan="3" style="background-color:#97DEFF"|1 October 1961

|}

Final

See also
1960–61 Norwegian Main League
1961 in Norwegian football

References

Norwegian Football Cup seasons
Norway
Football Cup